KMKX (93.5 FM) is a radio station broadcasting a classic rock format. Licensed to Willits, California, United States, the station serves the Fort Bragg-Ukiah area.  The station is currently owned by Radio Millennium LLC and features programming from Westwood One.

History
The station went on the air as KZPB on 1990-09-20.  On 1991-01-28, the station changed its call sign to KLLK-FM, and on 1999-12-22, the call sign was changed to the current KMKX.

References

External links

MKX
Classic rock radio stations in the United States
Radio stations established in 1990
1990 establishments in California